Elmer Francis Bailey (born December 13, 1957) is an American former professional football player who spent three seasons in the National Football League (NFL) with the Miami Dolphins and Baltimore Colts between 1980 and 1982. Bailey appeared in 31 career games after being drafted from the University of Minnesota, he also attended Lincoln (MO) before transferring to Minnesota.

References

Living people
1957 births
Miami Dolphins players
Baltimore Colts players
American football wide receivers
Players of American football from Illinois
Minnesota Golden Gophers football players